Marwencol is a miniature town in Kingston, New York created by the American artist Mark Hogancamp.

On April 8, 2000, Mark Hogancamp was attacked outside of a bar by five men who beat him nearly to death after he drunkenly told them he was a cross-dresser. After nine days in a coma and 40 days in the hospital, Hogancamp was discharged with brain damage that left him little memory of his previous life. Unable to afford therapy, he created his own memory by building a -scale World War II-era Belgian town in his yard and populating it with dolls representing himself, his friends, and even his attackers. He called the town "Marwencol", blending his own name with that of a local bartender Wendy and his neighbor Colleen.

Hogancamp was initially discovered by photographer David Naugle, who documented and shared his story with Esopus magazine, whereby his work was shown in White Columns art gallery.

In media
The  film Marwencol (also known as Village of the Dolls in the UK) is a 2010 American documentary film that explores Hogancamp's life and work. It is the debut feature of director-editor Jeff Malmberg. It was the inspiration for Welcome to Marwen, a 2018 drama directed by Robert Zemeckis and starring Steve Carell as Hogancamp.

Welcome to Marwencol is a 2015 art book by Hogancamp and Chris Shellen, published by Princeton Architectural Press, that documents Hogancamp's life and work. It was named one of the best books of 2015 by Amazon.com.

References

External links
 
 Ronson, Jon (October 28, 2015). "Marwencol: the incredible WWII art project created by a cross-dresser who was beaten up by bigots". The Guardian.
 Daily Freeman (May 29, 2000). "Another arrested in bar assault" Daily Freeman.
 Times Herald-Record (April 11, 2000) "2nd man held in assault that left victim in coma" Times Herald-Record.

Action figures
Barbie
Kingston, New York
Miniature parks
Outsider art
Scale modeling
Works about Belgium
World War II in popular culture